Experimental Breeder Reactor I (EBR-I) is a decommissioned research reactor and U.S. National Historic Landmark located in the desert about  southeast of Arco, Idaho. It was the world's first breeder reactor.  At 1:50 p.m. on December 20, 1951, it became one of the world's first electricity-generating nuclear power plants when it produced sufficient electricity to illuminate four 200-watt light bulbs. EBR-I subsequently generated sufficient electricity to power its building, and continued to be used for experimental purposes until it was decommissioned in 1964.  The museum is open for visitors from late May until early September.

History
As part of the National Reactor Testing Station (since 2005 Idaho National Laboratory), EBR-I's construction started in late 1949. The reactor was designed and constructed by a team led by Walter Zinn at the Argonne National Laboratory Idaho site, known as Argonne-West. In its early stages, the reactor plant was referred to as Chicago Pile 4 (CP-4) and Zinn's Infernal Pile. Installation of the reactor at EBR-I took place in early 1951 (the first reactor in Idaho) and it began power operation on August 24, 1951. On December 20 of that year, atomic energy was successfully harvested at EBR-1 for the first time. The following day, the reactor produced enough power to light the whole building. The power plant produced 200 kW of electricity out of 1.4 MW of heat generated by the reactor.

The design purpose of EBR-I was not to produce electricity but instead to validate nuclear physics theory that suggested that a breeder reactor should be possible. In 1953, experiments revealed the reactor was producing additional fuel during fission, thus confirming the hypothesis. On November 29, 1955, the reactor at EBR-I suffered a partial meltdown during a coolant flow test. The flow test was trying to determine the cause of unexpected reactor responses to changes in coolant flow. It was subsequently repaired for further experiments, which determined that thermal expansion of the fuel rods and the thick plates supporting the fuel rods was the cause of the unexpected reactor response.

Although EBR-I produced the first electricity available in-house, a nearby experimental boiling water reactor plant called BORAX-III (also designed, built, and operated by Argonne National Laboratory) was connected to external loads, powering the nearby city of Arco, Idaho in 1955, the first time a city had been powered solely by nuclear power.

Besides generating the world's first electricity from atomic energy, EBR-I was also the world's first breeder reactor and the first to use plutonium fuel to generate electricity (see also the Clementine nuclear reactor). Correction: The world's first electricity from atomic energy was generated 3 years earlier in September 1948 at the X-10 Graphite Reactor at the Oak Ridge National Lab in Tennessee. EBR-I's initial purpose was to prove Enrico Fermi's fuel breeding principle, a principle that showed a nuclear reactor producing more fuel atoms than consumed. Along with generating electricity, EBR-1 would also prove this principle.

Design

EBR-I used uranium metal fuel and NaK primary coolant. It was in this identical to the initial configuration of the later Dounreay Fast Reactor which first went critical in 1959.

Decommission and legacy
EBR-I was deactivated by Argonne in 1964 and replaced with a new reactor, Experimental Breeder Reactor II.

It was declared a National Historic Landmark in 1965 with its dedication ceremony held on August 25, 1966, led by President Lyndon Johnson and Glenn T. Seaborg. It was also declared an IEEE Milestone in 2004.

Gallery

See also

Argonne National Laboratory
Obninsk Nuclear Power Plant, 5MWe, the first nuclear reactor to supply electricity to a power grid.
Calder Hall, England, the first nuclear power station to deliver power in commercial quantities.
Aircraft Nuclear Propulsion Project
Idaho National Laboratory
List of National Historic Landmarks in Idaho
National Register of Historic Places listings in Butte County, Idaho

References
Citations

Bibliography

Argonne National Laboratory EBR-1 – The EBR-1 reactor was designed, built, and operated by Argonne National Laboratory. 
Page about EBR-1 at INL web site
IEEE History Center: EBR-I
INL EBR-1
ANS EBR-I History 
Essay by Matthew Croson
Atomic Heritage Foundation

External links

 
 
  
 ERB-1 Core Disassembly

Buildings and structures in Butte County, Idaho
Energy infrastructure completed in 1951
Former nuclear power stations in the United States
Nuclear power plants in Idaho
Fast-neutron reactors
Historic Mechanical Engineering Landmarks
National Historic Landmarks in Idaho
Nuclear research reactors
History museums in Idaho
Science museums in Idaho
Museums in Butte County, Idaho
Industrial buildings and structures on the National Register of Historic Places in Idaho
National Register of Historic Places in Butte County, Idaho
Energy infrastructure on the National Register of Historic Places
Nuclear accidents and incidents in the United States